The 2015–16 William & Mary Tribe men's basketball team represented the College of William & Mary during the 2015–16 NCAA Division I men's basketball season. The Tribe were led by thirteenth year head coach Tony Shaver. The team played its home games at Kaplan Arena and remained members of the Colonial Athletic Association (CAA). This was the 111th season of the collegiate basketball program at William & Mary. They finished the season 20–11, 11–7 in CAA play to finish in a three way tie for third place. They advanced to the semifinals of the CAA tournament where they lost Hofstra. Despite again securing twenty wins for the season, the Tribe failed to secure back-to-back postseason tournament bids for the first time in program history. Along with the 2013–14 and 2014–15 seasons, this was only the second time in program history that William & Mary won twenty games during three consecutive seasons.

Previous season
The team tried to improve upon their 20–13 (12–6 CAA) record from the 2014–15 season that saw the team fall short, for the second straight year, of a conference championship with a 61–72 loss to Northeastern in the championship game of the 2015 CAA men's basketball tournament. The Tribe ultimately received an automatic bid to the National Invitation Tournament, where they lost in the first round to Tulsa. The Tribe also saw the graduation of the program's all-time leading scorer, Marcus Thornton. Thornton, who was drafted by the Boston Celtics in the second round of the 2015 NBA draft, is currently playing for the Sydney Kings in the Australian National Basketball League.

Departures

Recruiting Class of 2015

Roster

Schedule 

|-
!colspan=9 style="background:#115740; color:#B9975B;"| Non-conference regular season

|-
!colspan=9 style="background:#115740; color:#B9975B;"| CAA regular season

|-
!colspan=9 style="background:#115740; color:#B9975B;"| CAA Tournament

See also
2015–16 William & Mary Tribe women's basketball team

References

William And Mary
William & Mary Tribe men's basketball seasons
William and Mary Tribe men's basketball
William and Mary